Maggie Wu may refer to:

Maggie Wu (businesswoman), Chinese business executive, CFO of Alibaba
Maggie Wu (actress), Taiwanese actress and model